Mayakovskaya, is a Moscow Metro station on the Zamoskvoretskaya Line, in the Tverskoy District of central Moscow.

The name as well as the design is a reference to Futurism and its prominent Russian exponent Vladimir Mayakovsky. Considered to be one of the most beautiful in the system, it is a fine example of pre-World War II Stalinist Architecture and one of the most famous Metro stations in the world. It is best known for its 34 ceiling mosaics depicting "24 Hours in the Land of the Soviets." During World War II, it was used as a command post for Moscow's anti-aircraft regiment.

History 
The station was built as part of the second stage of the Moscow Metro expansion, opening on 11 September 1938. If the first stage was more focused on the building of the system itself, both architecturally and in terms of the engineering, the stations appear modest in comparison to those that the second stage brought to the system. For the first time in the world, instead of having the traditional three-neath pylon station layout, the engineers were able to overlap the vault space and support it with two colonnades, one on each side. This gave birth to a new Deep column station type design, and Mayakovskaya was the first station to show this.

Located 33 meters beneath the surface, the station became famous during World War II when an air raid shelter was located in the station. On the anniversary of the October Revolution, on 7 November 1941, Joseph Stalin addressed a mass assembly of party leaders and ordinary Muscovites in the central hall of the station. During World War II, Stalin took residence in this place.

At the 1939 New York World's Fair the Soviet Pavilion included a life-size showcase copy of this station, whose designer Alexey Dushkin was awarded Grand Prize of the 1939 World's Fair.

Design 
Alexey Dushkin's Art Deco architecture was based on a Soviet future as envisioned by the poet Mayakovsky. The station features streamlined columns faced with stainless steel and pink rhodonite, white Ufaley and grey Diorite marble walls, a flooring pattern of white and pink marble, and 35 niches, one for each vault. Surrounded by filament lights there are a total of 34 ceiling mosaics by Alexander Deyneka with the theme "24-Hour Soviet Sky."

In 2005 a new second north exit was built, along with a new vestibule. Passengers leaving the station first descend on a short escalator ride into an underground vestibule, and then ascend the long way to the surface. The new exit also allows access to the 35th mosaic, which was previously hidden behind the service section. Other mosaic works were designed from scratch, accompanied by ample use of marble and stainless steel sculpturing. The bust of the poet Vladimir Mayakovsky was moved to the new surface vestibule, whose ceiling was also decorated with a mosaic composition from Mayakovsky's poem "Moscow Sky".

Gallery

References 

Moscow Metro stations
Railway stations in Russia opened in 1938
Tverskoy District
Zamoskvoretskaya Line
Colonnades
Stalinist architecture
Railway stations located underground in Russia
Cultural heritage monuments of regional significance in Moscow